Whegs (wheel-legs or wing-legs) are mechanisms for robot locomotion.  Whegs use a strategy of locomotion that combines the simplicity of the wheel with the obstacle-clearing advantages of the foot.

Whegs were pioneered at the Biologically Inspired Robotics Laboratory at Case Western Reserve University. Whegs development and improvements based on cockroach climbing behavior in several robots has been done in collaboration with the Ritzmann lab in the Biology department at Case Western Reserve University on cockroach climbing behavior. 

Whegs robots were inspired by the Prolero robot, designed in 1996 at the European Space Agency, and the RHex robot, developed by a multiuniversity effort funded by the Defense Advanced Research Projects Agency.  The mobility system is based on studies on the locomotion of the cockroach.

Wing-legs are found on flying robots and are wings dual-purposed as legs for locomotion when the robot is on the ground.

References

Hexapod robots
Robots of the United States
Biorobotics
2000s robots